The Romantic Road is a "theme route" devised by promotion-minded travel agents in the 1950s. In medieval times, part of it was a trade route that connected the center of Germany with the south. Today, this region is thought by many international travellers to possess "quintessentially German" scenery and culture, in towns and cities such as Nördlingen, Dinkelsbühl and Rothenburg ob der Tauber and in castles such as Burg Harburg and the famous Neuschwanstein.

With about five million overnight stays, four to five times that number of day visits and around 15,000 tourist jobs generated by the route, it is an economically important southern German travel destination.

Along the route
from north to south:
 Würzburg
 Holzkirchen (Unterfranken) (new itinerary since 2016)
 Urphar (new itinerary since 2016)
 Wertheim (new itinerary since 2016)
 Tauberbischofsheim
 Lauda-Königshofen
 Bad Mergentheim
 Weikersheim
 Röttingen
 Creglingen
 Rothenburg ob der Tauber
 Schillingsfürst
 Feuchtwangen
 Dinkelsbühl
 Wallerstein
 Nördlingen
 Harburg
 Donauwörth
 Augsburg
 Friedberg
 Kaufering
 Landsberg am Lech
 Hohenfurch
 Schongau
 Peiting
 Rottenbuch
 Wildsteig
 Steingaden and Wieskirche
 Halblech
 Schwangau, Neuschwanstein and Hohenschwangau
 Füssen

See also
Japan Romantic Road, the Romantic Road's sister route in Japan

References

External links

Official website 
Official website 
Romantic Road, Article
Article about the Romantic Road

German tourist routes
Roads in Baden-Württemberg
Cycleways in Germany
Transport in Bavaria
Transport in Baden-Württemberg
Tourist attractions in Bavaria
Tourist attractions in Baden-Württemberg